Maksym Mykhaylovych Marchenko (born 10 February 1983) is a Ukrainian colonel, former commander of the 28th Mechanized Brigade and the Aidar Battalion of the Ukrainian Ground Forces and he was Governor of Odesa Oblast fron 1 March 2022 to 15 March 2023.

Biography 
Marchenko was born on 10 February 1983 in Sloviansk, Donetsk Oblast. In 2005, he graduated from the Kharkiv Institute of Tank Troops and studied the Command and Staff Institute for the Use of Troops (Forces) of the National University of Defense of Ukraine.

From 2015 to 2017 he served as the commander of one of the assault battalion of Ukrainian Ground Forces, the Aidar Battalion.

Later, in 2017, he was appointed Deputy Commander of the 92nd Mechanized Brigade, where he stayed for a short time because he led another brigade for a year.

In April 2019, he was promoted to the rank of colonel.

Governor of Odesa Oblast 
On 1 March 2022, during the Russian invasion of Ukraine, he was appointed Governor of Odesa Oblast, succeeding Serhiy Hrynevetsky. On 15 March 2022, Marchenko appointed Anatoly Vorokhaev as his deputy. The same day, Marchenko met with Bernard-Henri Lévy in Odesa. Marchenko was dismissed as Governor by Presidential decree on 15 March 2023.

References

External links 

 Maksym Marchenko on Telegram

Living people
1983 births
People from Sloviansk
Ukrainian military personnel
Governors of Odesa Oblast
Pro-Ukrainian people of the war in Donbas
Ukrainian military personnel of the war in Donbas
People of the 2022 Russian invasion of Ukraine